MA-6 may refer to:

 
 Massachusetts Route 6
 Mercury-Atlas 6, a spaceflight of Project Mercury